is a junction passenger railway station located in Inage-ku, Chiba, Japan, operated by East Japan Railway Company (JR East).

Lines
Inage Station is located on the Sōbu Main Line, 35.0 km from Tokyo Station, and is served by both Sōbu Line (Rapid) services and Chūō-Sōbu Line all-stations "Local" services.

Station layout
The station consists of two elevated island platforms with the station building underneath. The station has a Midori no Madoguchi staffed ticket office and also a "View Plaza" travel agency.

Platforms

History
The station opened on 13 September 1899. The station was absorbed into the JR East network upon the privatization of the Japan National Railways (JNR) on 1 April 1987.

Passenger statistics
In fiscal 2019, the station was used by an average of 49,966 passengers daily (boarding passengers only).

Surrounding area
Inage Ward Office 
Inage Library
Chiba City Konakadai Elementary School
Chiba Municipal Chiba High School

See also
 List of railway stations in Japan

References

External links

 JR East station information 

Railway stations in Chiba (city)
Railway stations in Japan opened in 1899
Chūō-Sōbu Line